Wales has produced a number of manuscripts over the centuries. Although most were written in Middle Welsh or Old Welsh, some were also written in Latin. In some of the more recent manuscripts it is not uncommon to have texts in Welsh, Latin, French and English in the same volume. However, some of the most important medieval manuscripts were written in Latin only, e.g. the Cyfraith Hywel.

Collections 
There are several compilations of Welsh manuscripts. The most important, from a Welsh-language literature standpoint, are:
 Cwrtmawr Manuscripts, in the National Library of Wales collection
 Llansteffan Manuscripts, in the National Library of Wales collection
 Peniarth Manuscripts, in the National Library of Wales collection

Individual manuscripts 
 Hendregadredd Manuscript (National Library of Wales); circa 1300-1330s
 Manuscript Juvencus (Cambridge University Library; 9th-10th century)
 Book of Ancr Llanddewibrefi (Bodleian Library, Oxford)
 Book of Aneirin
 Book of Bicar Woking
 Book of Red Asaph
 Red Book of Hergest (Jesus College, Oxford; 14th century)
 Red Book of Nannau
 Red Book of Talgarth
 Black Book of Basingwerk
 Black Book of Carmarthen (National Library of Wales, Aberystwyth; 13th century)
 Black Book of Chirk
 Black Book of Tyddewi
 White Book of Corsygedol
 White Book of Hergest
 White Book of Rhydderch (around 1325)
 Book of Llandaf
 Lichfield Gospels
 Book of Taliesin (Peniarth 2)
 Peniarth 6 (National Library of Wales; second half of the 13th century perhaps)
 Peniarth 20
 Peniarth 28 (National Library of Wales; 13th century)

Bibliography 
 Daniel Huws, Llyfrau Cymraeg 1250-1400 (National Library of Wales, Aberystwyth, 1993). Lecture of Sir John Williams.

Welsh manuscripts
Medieval manuscripts